Vincenzo Milione (1735–1805) was an Italian painter.

Milione was born in Calabria. He moved to Rome where he worked. He primarily painted portraits. One of his works is located at the Pinacoteca Nazionale di Bologna. He died in Rome in 1805.

References

18th-century Italian painters
Italian male painters
19th-century Italian painters
1735 births
1805 deaths
People from Calabria
19th-century Italian male artists
18th-century Italian male artists